Egoi Martínez de Esteban (born 15 May 1978 in Etxarri-Aranatz, Navarre)  is a Spanish former professional road bicycle racer, who competed as a professional between 2001 and 2013. In his first Tour de France, Martínez finished 41st overall at the 2004 Tour de France.

Martínez retired at the end of the 2013 season.

Career achievements

Major results

2001
 1st  Overall Vuelta Ciclista a León
 2nd Overall Vuelta a Navarra
2002
 10th Overall Tour de l'Avenir
2003
 1st  Overall Tour de l'Avenir
2004
 4th Overall Tour du Gévaudan Languedoc-Roussillon
2005
 4th GP Miguel Induráin
2006
 Vuelta a España
1st  Mountains classification
1st Stage 11
 4th Overall Vuelta a Castilla y León
  Combativity Award Stage 4 Tour de France
2008
 1st  Mountains classification, Tour of the Basque Country
 9th Overall Vuelta a España
Held  after Stages 9–12
Held  after Stages 2–3 & 5
 10th Klasika Primavera
  Combativity Award Stage 15 Tour de France
2009
 1st  Mountains classification, Tour de France
 1st  Mountains classification, Tirreno–Adriatico
 1st  Sprints classification, Tour of the Basque Country
 2nd Klasika Primavera
2010
 1st  Mountains classification, Criterium du Dauphiné
 9th Klasika Primavera

Grand Tour general classification results timeline

References

External links

 
 
 Palmares on CyclingBase (French)

1978 births
Living people
People from Barranca (comarca)
Spanish male cyclists
Cyclists from Navarre
Spanish Vuelta a España stage winners